Japelaq-e Gharbi Rural District is a rural district (dehestan) in Japelaq District, Azna County, Lorestan Province, Iran. At the 2006 census, its population was 4,215, in 1,005 families.  The rural district has 26 villages.

References 

Rural Districts of Lorestan Province
Azna County